This is a list of NCAA Division I Football Bowl Subdivision college football post-season games that were rematches of regular season games.

Teams that lost in the regular season have won more times in the rematch, as the regular season losers have a record of 16–7 in post-season games. Conversely, rematches that occur in conference championship games have winners of the first game possessing a record of 34-23.  Two of the twenty-five rematches in bowl games featured teams that tied during the regular season.

1944 Orange Bowl
Texas A&M defeated LSU at Baton Rouge by a score of 28–13. The two teams were selected to play in the Orange Bowl after each finished second in their respective conferences. In the rematch, Tigers' halfback Steve Van Buren was responsible for all of their points, and LSU won by a score of 19–14.

1946 Gator Bowl
Wake Forest and South Carolina tied 13–13 in a game played at Charlotte, North Carolina. Neither team had played in a bowl game before and were invited to face each other again in the first Gator Bowl. Wake Forest edged past the Gamecocks 28-14 before a sparse crowd of 7,362.

1957 Rose Bowl
Iowa hosted Oregon State on October 6, 1956, coming away with a 14–13 victory. After the Beavers won the Pacific Coast Conference and the Hawkeyes became champions of the Big Ten Conference, both earned a spot in the Rose Bowl. Both teams were productive offensively, but Iowa produced more points and won 35-19.

1960 Sugar Bowl
The defending national champion LSU Tigers scored in the 4th quarter to beat visiting Ole Miss 7–3, one of only three scores that the Rebel defense gave up all season. After getting past Ole Miss, LSU lost by one point to Tennessee. With Southeastern Conference champion Georgia, who had faced neither Ole Miss nor LSU, selected to play in the Orange Bowl, the Sugar Bowl chose to have the home-state Tigers, ranked #3 nationally, face a rematch against #2 Ole Miss. The Rebels held LSU to just 74 yards of offense, winning by a score of 21–0. This is one of only three bowl games to have featured a rematch of conference foes. Oddly, LSU has not only been in two of those three games, but has lost by the same score each time.

1966 Rose Bowl
Michigan State won their season opener at Spartan Stadium over UCLA 13–3. The Spartans remained undefeated through the regular season, capturing the Big Ten Conference title. Unheralded UCLA surprised many by becoming the Athletic Association of Western Universities champion, earning a rematch with Michigan State in the Rose Bowl. Future Heisman winner Gary Beban led the Bruins to a 14–0 halftime lead, which held up as Michigan State scored twice in the 4th quarter but on both occasions attempted and failed two-point conversions.

1976 Rose Bowl
Ohio State, led by two-time Heisman winner Archie Griffin, defeated UCLA at the Los Angeles Memorial Coliseum by an impressive score of 41–20 on October 4. Buckeyes coach Woody Hayes prophetically told his team that they would see the Bruins again. Going undefeated through the regular season, the Big Ten champion Buckeyes were ranked #1 and favored to win the Rose Bowl and the national championship, with Pacific 8 champ UCLA the only obstacle remaining. The Bruins had been the only team to score more than 14 on Ohio State in the regular season and managed to do so again on New Years Day. After holding Ohio State to a field goal in the first half, UCLA scored four times to the Buckeyes' one score in the second half to defeat them 23–10. The upset allowed the Oklahoma Sooners to claim the national championship.

1979 Orange Bowl
Oklahoma and Nebraska were both undefeated in conference play going into their showdown in Lincoln, Nebraska on November 11. With the Huskers up 17–14 in the 4th quarter, the Sooners were in scoring position when Billy Sims fumbled on the Nebraska 3 yard line with 3:27 remaining. The Cornhuskers recovered the ball and subsequently notched their first victory over Oklahoma since the 1971 Game of the Century. The Orange Bowl had been seeking to set up Penn State against Nebraska for the national championship, but the Huskers lost the next week to Missouri and the Nittany Lions went to the Sugar Bowl where they would lose to Alabama. With Notre Dame headed to the Cotton Bowl, the only top team left to face the Big Eight champion Cornhuskers was Oklahoma. The Sooners had a 14–0 lead at halftime, and in the third quarter, they opened up their lead to 31–10. Nebraska scored twice in the fourth quarter, but it was not enough to overcome Oklahoma, as they won with a final score of 31–24.

1983 Rose Bowl
Michigan was 1–1 when they hosted UCLA on September 25 and afterward was 1–2 as UCLA came back from a 21-point deficit to win 31–27. The Bruins would win the Pac-10 and a birth in the Rose Bowl. Michigan recovered from their slow start to capture the Big Ten championship. In addition to their regular season meeting earlier in the year, the two teams had faced each other 366 days earlier on New Year's Eve in the 1981 Astro-Bluebonnet Bowl where the Wolverines had triumphed 33–14. In their third meeting in a years' time, the Bruins took the rubber match over Michigan by a score of 24–14.

1988 Rose Bowl
Michigan State put up a 27–13 victory on USC to open the season at Spartan Stadium. Despite suffering two losses after beating USC, the Spartans righted the ship and went undefeated in Big Ten play, winning the conference championship. The Trojans also picked up two more losses but salvaged their season with a Pac-10 title and a Rose Bowl birth. Despite three turnovers, USC had the game tied in the fourth quarter. Michigan State kicked a field goal to take the lead in and on the ensuing Trojan drive, Rodney Peete fumbled a snap at the Spartan 29-yard line with just two minutes remaining. After recovering the ball and running out the clock, the Spartans claimed a 20–17 victory.

1994 Las Vegas Bowl
UNLV visited Mount Pleasant, Michigan on September 10, where they lost to the Chippewas of Central Michigan, 35–23. Central Michigan compiled an 8–1 conference record en route to a Mid-American Conference championship and a bid to the Las Vegas Bowl. UNLV stumbled to a 6–5 finish but was good enough to win part of the Big West Conference title and a spot in their hometown bowl game. The Chippewas turned the ball over four times and never kept the game close, as the Rebels ran away with a 52–24 win.

1995 Sugar Bowl
On November 26, the visiting Florida Gators left Tallahassee with a 31–31 tie with in-state rival Florida State, which would be the last tie in program history for both teams. FSU had already secured the ACC championship, while Florida would defeat Alabama to claim the SEC title. Taking a 13-point lead into the fourth quarter of the Sugar Bowl, the Seminoles gave up a touchdown with 3:47 left to play. Florida regained possession of the ball with 2:27 left, but an interception sealed the Gators' fate and the Seminoles were victorious, 23–17.

1995 Las Vegas Bowl
The Toledo Rockets roared into the Las Vegas Bowl without a loss, their only blemish being a tie with Miami (OH). Among their nine wins was a week 3 victory in Reno over eventual Big West Conference champion Nevada by a score of 49–35. The two schools met again at Sam Boyd Stadium on December 14. Toledo took an early lead but Nevada stayed in pursuit, finally catching in the fourth quarter with a field goal to tie the score at 34 all and forcing the first overtime game in Division I-A football. The Wolfpack received the ball first and kicked a field goal, giving them their only lead of the game. With their possession, the Rockets scored a touchdown to get the win and complete an undefeated season.

1997 Sugar Bowl
Much like two years earlier, Florida and Florida State faced each other in the final regular season game of the year with FSU already capturing the ACC championship and Florida heading to a showdown with Alabama for the SEC title. This time, though, the two teams were undefeated and ranked #1 and #2 in the nation. The Seminoles took the first quarter 17–0, while the Gators struck back in the second quarter to end the half behind only 3. After holding each other scoreless in the third, each squad scored a touchdown in the fourth quarter. Florida scored last with little time remaining and had little option but to try an onside kick which careened out of bounds. The Seminoles took home a 24–21 win. After the Gators won against Alabama, the Bowl Alliance pitted the two highest ranked available teams against each other in the Sugar Bowl. With #2 Arizona State contractually obligated to play in the Rose Bowl, #1 Florida State found itself with a rematch against #3 Florida. The Gators never let up, scoring in double digits in every quarter to win 52–20 and, with ASU's loss in the 1997 Rose Bowl, claim their first national championship.

1997 Independence Bowl
A 4–5 Notre Dame squad rolled into Death Valley on November 15 to take on #11 LSU. The Irish had no penalties, committed no turnovers, and kept the Tigers to minimal big plays en route to a redemptive 24–6 win. The two schools met again on December 28 in Shreveport, Louisiana. Notre Dame took a 6–3 lead into halftime, but the second half was all LSU, with the Tigers taking revenge with a final score of 27–9.

2004 Gator Bowl
West Virginia was ranked #23 when they visited Maryland on September 20. The Terps were 1–2, with only a win over The Citadel, but they were well prepared for the Mountaineers, soundly defeating them 31–7. Finishing the regular season at 9-3, Maryland earned a trip to the Gator Bowl, where they would again go up against West Virginia, co-champs of the Big East and oddly enough again ranked #23 in the country. The second game's outcome was similar to the first, as the Mountaineers could only muster one touchdown and the Terrapins captured a 41–7 victory.

2004 Orange Bowl
On October 11, the #2 Miami Hurricanes went to Doak Campbell Stadium and defeated #5 Florida State 22–14.  The 'Canes appeared to be on their way to another BCS National Championship appearance until losing twice, first to Virginia Tech and then to Tennessee. They still captured a Big East title and received an invite to the Orange Bowl to face the ACC champion, Florida State. The Seminoles got out to a 14–3 lead, but Miami fought back, scoring ten points in the second quarter. At halftime, Miami was down by one point. On their opening possession of the second half, the Hurricanes improved on good field position just enough to be able to kick a 51-yard field goal. The rest of the game was a defensive struggle, as no more scoring took place. Miami squeaked by with a 16–14 victory. FSU went to Little Havana to open the 2004 season by facing the 'Canes for the third time in 13 months. In another close, hard-fought contest, Miami won again with a final score of 16–10.

2007 Motor City Bowl
Purdue hosted the Chippewas from Central Michigan on September 15, shutting out the visitors in the first half and posting a 45–22 win. Central Michigan had five losses in the regular season but only one was in conference and they defeated Miami of Ohio convincingly in the MAC Championship, earning themselves a spot in the Motor City Bowl to once again face the Boilermakers. Just as in the first game, Purdue opened up a big first-half lead, but Central Michigan responded by scoring 28 points in the third quarter to tie the game. Both teams added another touchdown in the fourth quarter and Purdue hit a field goal as time expired to win 51-48.

2007 Las Vegas Bowl
In the second game of the season for both schools, BYU took a trip to the Rose Bowl where they lost 27–17 to #14 UCLA.  The Bruins' season would be marred by injuries to their starting and backup quarterbacks along with six losses to go with their six wins.  They entered the Las Vegas Bowl at .500 to face the Cougars who had rebounded from their two early losses to win the Mountain West Conference.  UCLA went in at halftime down 17–13, but the defenses took over in the second half.  The Bruins scored on a 50-yard field goal in the 4th quarter to get within one point, and at the end of the game, UCLA attempted a field goal to give them the win. BYU managed to block the kick, allowing the Cougars to escape with a 17–16 victory.

2008 EagleBank Bowl
With a 2–2 record, Navy surprised #15 Wake Forest at BB&T Field with a 24–17 upset.  That would be the first of five losses for the Deacons, but their seven wins would be enough to earn an invitation to the EagleBank Bowl, later renamed the Military Bowl.  Their opponent would be 8-4 Navy.  The Midshipmen opened up a 13–0 lead, but Wake Forest would score four touchdowns (and a two-point conversion) to get revenge, winning 29–19.

2008 Armed Forces Bowl
Because of Hurricane Ike, the Houston Cougars traveled to Dallas to play Air Force on September 13.  A late charge by the Cougars wasn't enough and Air Force won 31-28.  After posting a 7–5 record in the regular season, Houston was chosen for the Armed Forces Bowl.  With Navy participating in the EagleBank Bowl and Army ineligible, Houston's opponent was the Air Force Falcons.  The Cougars couldn't pull away and twice Air Force was able to even up the score, but the Falcons could never capture a lead and Houston won 34–28.

2010 Holiday Bowl
Nebraska's first road game of the year was at Husky Stadium to face a 1–1 Washington Huskies squad that had gone 5–7 the year after a winless 0–12 season in 2008.  The Cornhuskers dominated the entire game, winning 56–21.  Nebraska would finish out the regular season at 10–3 with a loss to Oklahoma in the Big 12 Championship, earning a trip to the Holiday Bowl for the second year in a row.  Washington had improved from the previous year, but only to 6–6 which was still good enough to earn a bowl bid to face the Cornhuskers again.  This time, the Huskies defense shut down the Cornhuskers' offense, allowing far less points than in the earlier regular–season matchup. In the end, Washington earned an upset victory, 19–7. This was Steve Sarkisian's first bowl appearance and win as a head coach.

2012 BCS National Championship Game
In a game where the scoring consisted of nothing but field goals, LSU defeated Alabama in overtime on Nov. 5 in Tuscaloosa.  After Stanford and Boise St fell from the ranks of the undefeated on Nov. 12 and Oklahoma State lost for the first time on Nov. 18 the Crimson Tide found themselves in position to return to the national championship game despite not even winning their division, let alone their conference.  LSU found itself facing Alabama in the Mercedes-Benz Superdome on Jan. 9.  The second game was not unlike the first in that the first five scores were all field goals, but this time they were not split between the two teams as the Tigers ended with no points.  The Tide added a touchdown in the fourth quarter but missed the extra point for a final of 21–0.

2012 Liberty Bowl
Iowa State opened its season with a 38–23 victory over the Tulsa Golden Hurricane.  Tulsa would reel off ten wins after that and claim the Conference USA championship, while the Cyclones would struggle through their Big 12 schedule and barely get to six wins for bowl eligibility.  The two teams would meet again at Liberty Bowl Memorial Stadium in Memphis on New Year's Eve after the Liberty Bowl and Louisiana Tech couldn't agree on terms for the Bulldogs to appear.  Iowa State twice held leads of ten points in the first quarter, first after a pick-six and then after a 69-yard pass for a touchdown, but after that they would not score again and Tulsa would go on to a 31–17 victory.

2016 Heart of Dallas Bowl
On October 22, the Black Knights of Army lost at home to North Texas by a score of 35-18. The Mean Green were chosen to participate in the Heart of Dallas Bowl despite their 5-7 record on the basis of their Academic Progress Rating when there were not enough bowl-eligible teams to fill all the games. Army accepted an invitation to appear in the game after defeating Morgan State for their sixth win but before defeating rival Navy.  The cadets jumped out to a 24-7 lead, but North Texas fought back, finally forcing overtime where Army scored a touchdown and then shut down the Mean Green offense to seal the victory.

2022 College Football Playoff National Championship
On December 4, 2021, the Alabama Crimson Tide football team defeated the Georgia Bulldogs by a score of 41-24 at Mercedes-Benz Stadium in Atlanta, GA in the 2021 SEC Championship Game. The two teams met again on January 10, 2022 to compete for the College Football Playoff National Championship, where the Crimson Tide lost to the Bulldogs 33-18 at Lucas Oil Stadium in Indianapolis, IN.

Notes

Appearances by team

Rematches per Bowl

References

Post-season games